Sulaman Qadir (born 28 December 1984) is a Pakistani cricketer. He played in 26 first-class and 40 List A matches between 2000 and 2013. He made his Twenty20 debut on 25 April 2005, for Lahore Lions in the 2004–05 National Twenty20 Cup.

He runs his father's cricket academy in Lahore and is credited for launching the career of fast bowler Naseem Shah.

References

External links
 

1984 births
Living people
Pakistani cricketers
Lahore cricketers
Lahore Lions cricketers
Habib Bank Limited cricketers
Place of birth missing (living people)